Mahal Kita (English: I Love You) is the debut music album of Pinoy Pop Superstar 2008 grand champion Maricris Garcia.

Background 
Maricris Garcia won Pinoy Pop Superstar when she was 20 years old, the 3rd and final person to do so after Jonalyn Viray and Gerald Santos. Upon winning the title, she started receiving numerous singing projects and engagements. Many of her songs were used in Philippine telenovelas, like Mahal Kita, the "love theme" of the 2007 series MariMar, and Kung Sana Bukas, the ending theme of the 2008 series Babangon Ako't Dudurugin Kita.

The album’s carrier single entitled Bakit Ikaw Pa Rin, a rendition of Noah’s original, received massive airplay in various fm stations throughout the Philippines. Nang Dahil Sa'yo, the previously unreleased theme song of Mga Mata ni Anghelita, is included in the album.

Track listing 
Mahal Kita - (Marimar Theme Song)
With You
Bakit Ikaw Pa Rin
Umiibig Na Ba
Since Then
Ikaw Lang ang Iibigin
Thank You
I Love You Still
Kung Sana Bukas - (Babangon Ako't Dudurugin Kita Theme Song)
Kaligayahan Natin
Nang Dahil Sa’yo - (Mga Mata ni Anghelita Theme Song)
Huwag Mong Iwan ang Puso

See also 
GMA Network

2008 debut albums
GMA Music albums